The University of Delaware Figure Skating Club (UDFSC) was chartered in January 1986.  The University of Delaware is home to the Blue (Fred Rust Arena) and Gold arenas which serve as the home of the University of Delaware Figure Skating Club and the Delaware Ice Skating Science Development Center (ISSDC).  The University of Delaware Ice Skating Science Development Center (ISSDC) is a year-round training facility designed to meet the needs of figure skaters, first-time competitors and Olympians.  The ISSDC is directed by Ronald Ludington, who has coached skaters in 9 consecutive Olympics and 36 World Championships.  His personal credentials include several skating titles: U.S. Pair Champion (1956–60), U.S. Silver Dance Champion (1958), World Bronze Medalist (1959), Olympic Bronze Medalist (1960), and World Invitational Dance Champion (1965).

Coaching staff
The University of Delaware FSC is home to many top level National and International coaches.  This is one of the main draws to the skating club.  Among others, top coaches include:

 Ron Ludington
 Pamela Gregory
 Priscilla Hill
 Tiffany Scott
 Philip Dulebohn

Athletes
The following are athletes who have represented the club in competition or have trained at the club.

 Brent Bommentre
 Melissa Bulanhagui
 John Coughlin
 Albena Denkova
 Melissa Gregory
 Akiyuki Kido
 Anjelika Krylova
 Tara Lipinski
  Kimmie Meissner
Jordan Miller
 Bridget Namiotka
 Kimberly Navarro
 Oleg Ovsiannikov
 Ami Parekh
 Denis Petukhov
 Craig Ratterree
 Shaun Rogers
 Scott Smith
 Maxim Staviski
 Taylor Toth
 Geoffry Varner
Nozomi Watanabe
 Johnny Weir
 Sara Wheat
 Megan Williams-Stewart
 Christine Zukowski

In 2006, the University of Delaware sent 31 figure skaters to the U.S. Figure Skating Championships in St. Louis, Missouri, more than any other figure skating club in the United States.  Additionally, in 2011 thirty-two skaters from UD  qualified for senior and junior national teams after the Eastern sectional championships.

Collegiate Results
The University of Delaware has a record of strong performances in collegiate figure skating and is one of the top teams in the country as per national rankings.  They compete out of the Eastern Conference.  The University has been represented at every US National Intercollegiate Figure Skating Championships ever since its inception.  Teams qualify for the national championship by competing in three conference competitions.  At the conclusion of each event, skaters and university teams are awarded points in each of the three conferences: Eastern, Midwestern and Pacific Coast.  The top three teams from each conference qualify for the national championship.  Every year, approximately 40 teams enter into the conference competitions and nine qualify for Nationals.  The team has won the national championships six times, first in 2002 and most recently in 2016.

The University of Delaware Figure Skating Team has never placed lower than 3rd at the national championships and never lower than second in their conference.  Further, individual collegiate skaters who have placed in the top 3 at the US National Collegiate Figure Skating Championships include Melissa Parker (1999 & 2002, Sr.), Megan McAndrew (1999, Jr.), Mark Butt (2000, Jr.), Jennifer Don (2003, Sr.), Laura Stefanik (2006 & 2007, Jr.), Jazmyn Manzouri (2006 & 2007, Jr.), Taylor Toth (2007, Jr.), Kathleen Criss (2014, Jr.), Taylor Aruanno (2015, Jr.) and Matthew Kennedy (2019, Jr.).

References

External links
 University of Delaware Figure Skating Club
 University of Delaware Collegiate Figure Skating Club

University of Delaware
Figure skating clubs in the United States
1986 establishments in Delaware